Kabwelume Falls is a waterfall on the Kalungwishi River in the Northern Province of Zambia. The falls is about 6 km down stream of Lumangwe Falls. When viewed at peak water volume (April/May), a month after the wet season, the falls makes a spectacular semi circle of falling water. There are plans to build a hydro power station on this falls.

Waterfalls of Zambia
Geography of Northern Province, Zambia